Cercado is a province located in northwestern Bolivia in Beni Department. It has an area of 12,276 km ² with a population estimated by the National Institute of Statistics of Bolivia for 2006 of 94,221 and a density of 7.67 people / km ².  Its capital is the city of Trinidad.

Subdivision 
Cercado Province is divided into two municipalities which are partly further subdivided into cantons.

References 

Provinces of Beni Department